Battle Born is the fourth studio album by American rock band the Killers. It was released in the United Kingdom on September 17, 2012, by Vertigo Records and in the United States the following day by Island Records. The phrase "Battle Born" appears on the state flag of Nevada and is the name of the recording studio owned by the band, where the majority of the album was recorded.

Recorded following an extended hiatus, the band worked with five producers during the recording of the album: Steve Lillywhite, Damian Taylor, Brendan O'Brien, Stuart Price, and Daniel Lanois.

Background and recording
Following the completion of the band's Day & Age World Tour in January 2010, the Killers announced that the band would be entering an extended hiatus. During this time, frontman Brandon Flowers and bassist Mark Stoermer released solo albums, Flamingo (2010) and Another Life (2011), respectively, while drummer Ronnie Vannucci Jr. released a studio album with his side-project, Big Talk, and recorded with Mt. Desolation. Regarding the band's hiatus, Flowers noted, "Dave needed to see his kid and rest up. That was just how it worked. And so we ended up going off and doing solo things, and spending our time that way, and that was good, too. It was a good experience. It definitely taught us different ways of thinking about music."

In October 2011, the band ended its hiatus to begin work on a fourth studio album. Initial sessions were strained, with Flowers noting that the band members spent "about a week just eyeballing each other in a room." The composition of the album's first single, "Runaways", marked a turning point in their reunion, with Flowers noting: "That and 'Miss Atomic Bomb' were the backbone of this record. They made me feel we were on the right track."

Working at their Las Vegas studio, Battle Born, the band worked with producers Steve Lillywhite, Damian Taylor, Brendan O'Brien, Stuart Price, and Daniel Lanois. Initially, the band had wanted to work with just one, but scheduling difficulties led to the need for multiple producers.

The album was partially mixed by Alan Moulder, who also worked on the band's first two albums.

Release
On June 7, 2012, the Killers released a trailer for Battle Born. The track listing was announced on August 16. The album's first single was "Runaways", which received its first radio play on July 10. The single was leaked on Tumblr only hours before its official radio preview. Battle Born was released on September 17, 2012, in the United Kingdom and on September 18 in the United States. A week later, on September 25, the album was released as a vinyl disc.

Critical reception

Battle Born received generally positive reviews from music critics. At Metacritic, which assigns a normalized rating out of 100 to reviews from mainstream publications, the album received an average score of 64, based on 27 reviews.

Kyle Anderson of Entertainment Weekly wrote:

The Killers themselves have always gone for the gold, boldly aiming to fill exotic stadiums with full-throated anthems about big ideas. Like the band's previous output, Battle Born only knows how to be epic: Opener "Flesh and Bone" begins as a glitchy Soft Cell throwback before rapidly expanding into a glorious fireworks-and-brimstone sermon, while "Miss Atomic Bomb" drives into the desert sunset in a convertible fueled by echoey guitars and glistening-eyed nostalgia. These are big songs, determined to deliver photo-finish climaxes every few seconds.

The Guardians Kate Mossman gave the album three out of five stars, saying:

With stagey soundscapes more Meat Loaf than Springsteen, and lines overloaded with postcard imagery ("Your star-spangled heart took a train for the coast"), you struggle to find the energy till the third or fourth listen, when "Heart of a Girl" (co-written with Daniel Lanois) and "From Here on Out" (which sounds just like the Eagles) reveal themselves to be the sweetest, most sincere explorations of a kind of US rock that will always raise hairs on the necks of those who like this sort of thing.

Accolades
Battle Born was voted the second Best Album of 2012 by the readers of Rolling Stone magazine. Fuse's staff listed it as the 23rd Best Album of 2012.

Commercial performance
Battle Born debuted at number three on the US Billboard 200, selling 113,000 copies in its opening week. , it had sold 344,158 copies in the United States. The album debuted atop the UK Albums Chart with first-week sales of 93,989 copies—at that point the third highest opening tally of 2012—becoming the band's fourth consecutive number-one studio album in the United Kingdom. It had sold 371,000 copies in the United Kingdom . Battle Born also debuted at number three on the Canadian Albums Chart, selling 12,000 copies. The album reached the top 10 in 20 countries and became the 45th best-selling album worldwide of 2012, with sales of one million copies by the end of 2012.

Track listing

Notes
  signifies an additional producer
  signifies a remixer

Personnel
Credits adapted from the liner notes of the deluxe edition of Battle Born.

Studios
 Battle Born Studios (Las Vegas, Nevada) – recording ; mixing 
 Blackbird Studios (Nashville, Tennessee) – recording ; mixing 
 Golden Ratio (Montreal) – mixing 
 Assault and Battery 1 (London) – mixing 
 Germano Studios (New York City) – mixing 
 The Lodge (New York City) – mastering

The Killers
 Brandon Flowers
 Dave Keuning
 Mark Stoermer
 Ronnie Vannucci Jr.

Additional musicians

 Stuart Price – additional keyboards, programming 
 Damian Taylor – keyboards, programming 
 Las Vegas Master Singers – background vocals 
 Alissa Fleming – violin 
 Jennifer Eriksson – violin 
 Nate Kimball – trombone 
 Isaac Tubb – trumpet

Technical

 Steve Lillywhite – production ; additional production ; mixing 
 Damian Taylor – production ; mixing ; additional production 
 Robert Root – recording ; mixing 
 Brendan O'Brien – production, recording ; mixing 
 Alan Moulder – mixing 
 Catherine Marks – mix engineering 
 John Catlin – mix engineering 
 Felix Rashman – mixing assistance 
 Kenta Yonesaka – engineering assistance 
 Stuart Price – production, mixing ; remix 
 The Killers – production 
 Daniel Lanois – production 
 Emily Lazar – mastering
 Joe LaPorta – mastering

Artwork

 Warren Fu – art direction, design
 Martin Gomez – layout
 Williams + Hirakawa – photography
 Wyatt Boswell – additional photos
 Kristen Yiengst – art and photography production
 Doug Joswick – package production

Charts

Weekly charts

Year-end charts

Certifications and sales

References

2012 albums
Albums produced by Brendan O'Brien (record producer)
Albums produced by Damian Taylor
Albums produced by Daniel Lanois
Albums produced by Steve Lillywhite
Albums produced by Stuart Price
Island Records albums
The Killers albums
Vertigo Records albums